Kinabatangan is a federal constituency in Sandakan Division (Tongod District, Kinabatangan District and Beluran District), Sabah, Malaysia, that has been represented in the Dewan Rakyat since 1971.

The federal constituency was created in the 1966 redistribution and is mandated to return a single member to the Dewan Rakyat under the first past the post voting system.

Kinabatangan is the largest parliamentary constituency in Sabah and third largest in Malaysia overall, spanning an area of over 18,000 sq km.

Demographics 
第15届全国大选-东方日报-2022

History

Polling districts 
According to the gazette issued on 31 October 2022, the Kinabatangan constituency has a total of 27 polling districts.

Representation history

State constituency

Current state assembly members

Local governments

Election results

References

Sabah federal constituencies